Sreenarayanapuram Mahavishnu Temple is an ancient Vishnu temple in Kerala, India.

Festivals
Sreenarayanapuram Temple is known for the annual Dasavatarachartu festival. Dasavatarachartu is a ten-day celebration: Each day one Avatar of Mahavishnu from Dasavatara is worshiped. Sreenarayanapuram is one of the few Vishnu temples in Kerala where a Dasavatarachartu festival is conducted.

See also
 List of Hindu temples in Kerala
 Temples of Kerala
 Manakala
 Dasavatara

External links
 Vishnu Temples in Kerala
 Sreenarayanapuram Temple

Hindu temples in Pathanamthitta district
Vishnu temples